Robert Orr Polygonal Barn, also known as the Oxenrider Barn, is a historic twelve-sided building located in Plain Township, Kosciusko County, Indiana. The frame barn has two stories and was built between 1909 and 1911. It is topped by a three-pitch gambrel roof and a twelve-sided cupola.

It was listed on the National Register of Historic Places in 1992.

References

Round barns in Indiana
Barns on the National Register of Historic Places in Indiana
Buildings and structures completed in 1911
Buildings and structures in Kosciusko County, Indiana
National Register of Historic Places in Kosciusko County, Indiana